Haraldsen is a Norwegian surname, meaning son of Harald. Notable people with the surname include:

Harry Haraldsen (1911–1966), Norwegian speed skater
Katrine Lunde Haraldsen (born 1980), Norwegian handball player
Marit Haraldsen (born 1939), Norwegian alpine skier
Olaf Haraldsen (died c. 1143), Danish anti-king
Pia Haraldsen (born 1981), Norwegian television personality
Sonja Haraldsen (born 1937), now Queen Sonja of Norway, wife of King Harald V of Norway
Tom Reidar Haraldsen (born 1980), Norwegian footballer

See also
Haraldsson

Norwegian-language surnames
Patronymic surnames
Surnames from given names